Machhrehta is a village and corresponding community development block of Misrikh tehsil in Sitapur district, Uttar Pradesh, India.

As of 2011, the population of Machhrehta was 6,379, in 1,119 households.

History 
Machhrehta was founded during the reign of the Mughal emperor Akbar. It was named after a sadhu named Machhandar Nath who had lived here at a place called "Tap-Bhumi", or "ascetic place". Around the same time, it was demarcated as a pargana by Todar Mal. According to Kayastha oral tradition, at this time the chief landowner was an Abhan raja named Kesri Singh. He was deposed by Akbar, and his lands were granted to two Kayasthas, Bal Chand and Bir Chand. Bir Chand's father, Parasram, had served as dewan for Kesri Singh but had been executed by him. After Bal Chand and Bir Chand died, their lands were not inherited by their descendants, and instead various zamindars held the pargana's lands. C.S. Ferrar noted in 1877 that this story was "very similar to that told respecting Khairabad" and should be taken with a grain of salt.

In 1767, the grandfather of Ali Naqi Khan, who would serve as dewan to the King of Oudh, had received the pargana of Machhrehta as a jagir. He held it for 42 years. By Ferrar's time, 99 of the pargana's villages were held by Rajput zamindars; of the remaining 26, 7½ were held by Mir Muhammad Husen Khan, the taluqdar of Rajpura, who was the pargana's sole taluqdar. Mir Muhammad Husen Khan had acquired Rajpura, along with Kuli in the neighbouring pargana of Kurauna, via mortgage in the year 1262 fasli (1852 CE).

Ferrar described the town in his day as having 9 Hindu temples, including one which was next to a large tank called "Hardwar Tirath". This tank, he wrote, was considered holy, and every year during the month of Phagan, around two or three thousand devotees would come bathe here to wash away their sins. There were also 4 mosques at that time, and a relatively recent imambara.

Demographics 
The sex ratio of Machhrehta block in 2011 was 875, which was lower than the rural average of Sitamau district. In the 0-6 age group, the sex ratio was higher at 921, which was above the district rural average. Members of scheduled castes made up 45.05% of block residents, while members of scheduled tribes made up 0.01%. The block literacy rate was 65.01% (75.92% among men and 52.44% among women); the gender literacy gap of 23.48% was the highest in Sitamau district.

Most workers in Machhrehta block were employed in agriculture in 2011, with 41.87% being cultivators who owned or leased their own land and another 38.88% being agricultural labourers who worked someone else's land for wages. 4.93% of workers were household industry workers, and the remaining 14.32% were other workers. The workforce was overwhelmingly male (50,644 men and 9,959 women); a greater proportion of men were employed as cultivators than women (44.67% vs. 27.62%), and the same was true for agricultural labourers (40.11% vs. 32.64%). A greater proportion of women than men were employed as household industry workers (14.92% vs. 2.97%) and other workers (24.81% vs. 12.25%), although due to the raw numbers involved men outnumbered women in all four categories of workers.

Villages 
Machhrehta block contains the following 126 villages:

References 

Villages in Sitapur district